Babai Hotel is a 1992 Telugu-language comedy drama film directed by Jandhyala and produced by K. S. Rama Rao under the banner Creative Commercials. The film stars Brahmanandam, Gundu Hanumantha Rao and Kinnera. This movie was named based on Babai Hotel in Vijayawada.

Cast

 Brahmanandam as Rama Chandra Moorti
 Gundu Hanumantha Rao as Hanumantu
 Kinnera as Chukka
 Suthivelu as Simhachalam
 Kota Srinivasa Rao as Sundaraiah
 Sri Lakshmi as Sundaraiah's wife Rama
 Maathu as Swapna
 Dharmavarapu Subrahmanyam
 Pavala Syamala
 Venu Madhav
 Baby Karuna
 Baby Sreshta
 Gowtham Raju
 Kadambari Kiran
 Aalapati Lakshmi
 Master Anil
 Sameera
 Sri Hari Murthy
 Jeedigunta Sridhar
 Vinnakota Vijayaram
 Ananth as thief

Crew
 Story: Sainath
 Dialogues: Jandhyala
 Photography: Diwakar
 Screen Play: Jandhyala
 Editor: C. Manik Rao
 Music: Madhavapeddi Suresh
 Playback : S. P. Balasubrahmanyam, K. S. Chithra, P. Ramesh
 Lyrics: Veturi, Sahithi

References

External links

Indian Cinema Database
Babai Hotel(1992)

1992 films
1990s Telugu-language films
Films directed by Jandhyala
Films set in hotels